Sve što vidim i sve što znam (Serbian Cyrillic: Све што видим и све што знам; trans. All I See and All I Know) is the third album by the Serbian rock band Bjesovi, released in 1997.

Track listing 
All written by Goran Marić and Zoran Marinković, except where noted.
 "Verujem" (5:50)
 "Probudi me" (4:32)
 "Kad mi stane dah" (5:23)
 "Sve što vidim i sve što znam" (3:58)
 "Dar"(3:25)
 "Raduj se" (2:08)
 "Sve će se doznati" (3:22) (Monty Norman, Goran Marić, Zoran Marinković)
 "Moj izbor" (14:08) (Igor Malešević, Goran Marić, Zoran Marinković)

Personnel 
 Božidar Tanasković (bass)
 Igor Malešević (drums)
 Predrag Dabić (guitar)
 Zoran Filipović (guitar)
 Goran Marić (vocals)
 Zoran Marinković (vocals)
 Dragoljub Marković (keyboards on tracks 2 and 7)
 Vladimir Nikić (contrabass on track 3)
 Svetlana Spajić (vocals on track 4)
 Goran Đorđević (percussion)

External links 
 EX YU ROCK enciklopedija 1960-2006, Janjatović Petar; 
 Sve što vidim i sve što znam at Discogs

Bjesovi albums
1997 albums
Metropolis Records (Serbia) albums